Disterna norfolkensis is a species of beetle in the family Cerambycidae. It was described by Keith Collingwood McKeown in 1938. It is known from Australia.

References

Zygocerini
Beetles described in 1938